"I Will Get On" is a song by Norwegian singer-songwriter Annie. It was written and produced by Annie and DJ Tore "Erot" Kroknes. The track was released as a limited-edition 7-inch single and digital EP in 2002.

Track listings
Norwegian 7-inch single
(TELLÉ 014; released 2002)
A. "I Will Get On" (radio edit)
B. "I Will Get On" (Doc L's Recool Struction)

Digital EP
(Released )
"I Will Get On" (Joshua remix) – 8:38
"I Will Get On" (Joshua dub) – 8:38
"I Will Get On" (Laid remix) – 5:58
"I Will Get On" (Laid dub) – 5:56
"I Will Get On" – 5:51

UK promotional 12" single
(LOAD95; released 2003)
A. "I Will Get On" (Joshua remix)
AA. "I Will Get On" (Joshua dub)

Personnel
Credits adapted from 7-inch single liner notes.

 Annie – lead vocals, arrangement, production, songwriting
 Erot – arrangement, production, songwriting
 Knut Schreiner – guitar
 Torbjørn Brundtland – additional programming, engineering
 Svarte Marte – photography
 S. Heggren – sleeve artwork

Charts

References

2002 singles
2002 songs
Annie (singer) songs
Songs written by Annie (singer)